Brian Louis Allen Sutter (born October 7, 1956) is a Canadian former ice hockey forward and former head coach in the National Hockey League (NHL). Brian is the second oldest of the famous Sutter brothers and the oldest of the six that played in the NHL. He is also the only one to have his number retired by an NHL team.

Career

Player
Sutter was drafted by the St. Louis Blues during the 2nd round (20th overall) in the 1976 NHL Entry Draft. He played for the Blues until 1988, when a nagging back injury forced him into retirement. In 12 years with the Blues, he played in three NHL All-Star Games – 1982, 1983, and 1985. For the last nine years of his career, he was the Blues' captain. His jersey, #11, was retired by the St. Louis Blues on December 30, 1988.

Coaching
Immediately after retiring, he was named the Blues' head coach (1988–1992). In 1991, he won the Jack Adams Award as the NHL's best coach. All told, he spent the first 16 years of his adult life at ice level with the Blues.

Sutter subsequently held head coaching positions with the Boston Bruins, Calgary Flames, and Chicago Blackhawks (2001–2004). On June 21, 2005, the Blackhawks hired Dale Tallon as their new general manager; Tallon and the rebuilding Blackhawks decided not to renew Sutter's contract.

During the 2006–07 season, Sutter coached the Bentley Generals of the Chinook Hockey League, leading the team to its first berth in the Allan Cup, Canada's senior men's hockey championship.

Sutter was named the head coach of the Western Hockey League's Red Deer Rebels on July 12, 2007, replacing his younger brother Brent, who left the Rebels to become the head coach of the NHL's New Jersey Devils. On March 24, 2008, the Rebels announced that Brian Sutter had resigned as head coach of the team, citing personal reasons.

Sutter returned as head coach of the Generals for the 2008–09 season, leading them to its first Allan Cup title in 2009. In August 2012, Sutter left the Generals to become the new head coach of the Innisfail Eagles, also of the Chinook Hockey League.

Personal life
Sutter and his wife Judy have two children, a son Shaun and a daughter, Abigail.

Career statistics

Regular season and playoffs

International

Coaching statistics

See also
 List of NHL head coaches
 Notable families in the NHL

References

External links

1956 births
Boston Bruins coaches
Calgary Flames coaches
Canadian ice hockey left wingers
Chicago Blackhawks coaches
Edmonton Oilers (WHA) draft picks
Ice hockey people from Alberta
Jack Adams Award winners
Kansas City Blues players
Lethbridge Broncos players
Living people
National Hockey League All-Stars
National Hockey League players with retired numbers
People from Beaver County, Alberta
Red Deer Rebels coaches
Red Deer Rustlers players
St. Louis Blues coaches
St. Louis Blues draft picks
St. Louis Blues players
Brian
Canadian ice hockey coaches